Ümit Kurt (born 2 May 1991) is a Turkish footballer who plays as a centre back for Sakaryaspor. He made his Süper Lig debut on 24 April 2011 for MKE Ankaragücü.

Club career

MKE Ankaragücü

Ümit Kurt played 35 matches with MKE Ankaragücü and managed to score two goals playing as a center back defender.

Sivasspor

On 3 January 2013, Kurt was transferred to Sivasspor for €140,000. Kurt scored his first goal on 25 August 2013, against Konyaspor. He received a cross from Cicinho in the 67th minute from a right corner and scored with a flying header.

References

External links
 Player profile at TFF.org
 

1991 births
People from Osmaniye
Living people
Turkish footballers
Turkey B international footballers
Turkey international footballers
Association football central defenders
MKE Ankaragücü footballers
Sivasspor footballers
Çaykur Rizespor footballers
Boluspor footballers
Manisa FK footballers
Sakaryaspor footballers
Süper Lig players
TFF First League players
TFF Second League players